Judge Garland may refer to:
Merrick Garland, a United States lawyer, attorney general, and former federal judge
Patrick Garland (judge), a high court judge in the United Kingdom
Rice Garland (1799–1863), judge of the Louisiana Supreme Court